Probable G-protein coupled receptor 33 is a protein that in humans is encoded by the GPR33 gene.

References

Further reading

G protein-coupled receptors